Robert "Bob" Longfield is an American composer, arranger, conductor and educator, best known for his compositions for Concert Band and String Orchestra. He is currently the Music Director of the Greater Miami Symphonic Band.

Early life and education
Longfield was born and raised in Grand Rapids, Michigan. He graduated with honors from the University of Michigan where he studied with Jerry Bilik and Paul Boylan, and was a member of the band under William D. Revelli and George R. Cavender where he played saxophone. He received his master's degree in Music Education from the University of Miami where he was a student and personal friend of Alfred Reed.

Career
For fifteen years, Longfield was the band and orchestra director at Davison High School in Davison, Michigan. Since 1987, he has held a similar position at Miami Palmetto Senior High School in Pinecrest, Florida. Longfield was the recipient of the Teacher of the Year Award by the Michigan School Band and Orchestra Association. In 1996, he received the Mr. Holland Award from the National Academy of Recording Arts and Sciences and Sciences for outstanding contributions to music education.

A member of ASCAP, Longfield has received several commissions and his compositions and arrangements have been played and recorded by bands throughout the United States as well as in Europe and Japan.

In honor of Longfield's accomplishments, Miami-Dade County officially recognizes April 5, 2006 as Robert Longfield Day.

Selected compositions and arrangements

Music for concert band:
Hallelujah Chorus (from "The Messiah")
Allegretto
Cross Current
America
The Avengers
Downton Abbey (arrangement)
Purple Twilight
Eine Kleine "Pop" Music
El Camino Real (arrangement)
El Relicario (arrangement)
Freedom, Justice, Honor
In Glory Triumphant
In Quest of Excellence
Italian Holiday
Menuetto
Passacaglia on an Old English Carol
Russian Sailor Dance
Rapp's Woods Ramble
Oblivion (arrangement)
Sanctuary
Symphony No.2 in C minor
Take the Blues Train
The Abduction from Seraglio
The Honor Roll
The Hounds of Spring (arrangement)
The "X" Brigade
Turkish March
When Summer's in the Meadow
Where Valor Proudly Sleeps
Vortex
Fanfare for a Celebration
Fanfare for the Common Man (arrangement)

Music for string orchestra:

American Heritage Suite No. 1
Fugue No. 5 in D Major
Intrigue (A Tangoed Web)
Over the Waves
Plaisir d'amour
Prelude in E Minor
Rondo in Blue
The Skaters' Waltz
The Journey of the Magi
When Summer's in the Meadow
The Godfather (Love Theme)
Turning Point
Vortex (there is also an orchestra form)
Music from Frozen
La La Land Medley

References

American male composers
21st-century American composers
Living people
People from Davison, Michigan
Musicians from Grand Rapids, Michigan
University of Miami alumni
University of Michigan alumni
21st-century American male musicians
Year of birth missing (living people)